HD 30453 is a binary star system in the northern constellation of Auriga. It is visible to the naked eye with an apparent visual magnitude of 5.86. The system is located at a distance of approximately 334 light years from the Sun based on parallax. It is drifting further away from the Sun with a radial velocity of 16.65 km/s.

This is a double-lined spectroscopic binary system with an essentially circular orbit and a period of one week. The primary component is a chemically peculiar star of type CP1, or Am star, with a stellar classification of A8m. Abt and Morrell (1995) classed it as Am(A7/F0/F2), indicating it has the hydrogen lines of an A7 star, the calcium K line of a cooler F0 star, and the metallic kines of an F2 class. It has been mentioned as a potential variable star. The star has 3.6 times the girth of the Sun and is radiating 38 times the Sun's luminosity from its photosphere at an effective temperature of 7568 K. It has a moderate rotation rate, with a projected rotational velocity of around 16 km/s. 

References

Am stars
Spectroscopic binaries

Auriga (constellation)
Durchmusterung objects
030453
022407
1528